George Charles Deem Jr. (August 18, 1932 – August 11, 2008) was an American artist best known for reproducing vivid re-workings of classic images from art history. All artists rework the art of the past, at times imitating, at times extending, and at times rejecting the work of artists they admire. Deem moved the process of homage and change into uncharted territory. Art historian Robert Rosenblum has called Deem's unconventional thematic choices "free-flowing [fantasy] about the facts and fictions of art history."

Life and career
Deem was born in Vincennes, Indiana where he grew up and often worked alongside his cantaloupe-farmer father. He left his parents' farm to attend School of the Art Institute of Chicago. A year later, in 1953, the United States Army drafted him. After serving in Germany, he returned and completed his degree.

He spent some years in Italy researching the painting styles of Renaissance painters. Deem traveled the United States speaking and exhibiting his art, but lived most of his life at 10 West 18th Street in New York's Flatiron District.

Among the artists whose work he reproduced were Caravaggio, Jean-Baptiste-Siméon Chardin, Jean Auguste Dominique Ingres, Winslow Homer, Andrea Mantegna, Henri Matisse, Pablo Picasso and, especially, Johannes Vermeer, about whose style he wrote a book. During a 1993 visit to New York, Deem noted to his great-nephew, Kenneth J. Knight, Ph.D., that his favorite artist was Johannes Vermeer.

"The artist George Deem (1932-2008) had a unique relationship to and vision of the masterpieces of the past, especially the landmarks of Western painting that date from the Renaissance to the modern era. As Deem himself acknowledged, his abiding interest was in the two quintessential characteristics of Western art: first, the use of oil paint as a medium; and second, the development of a convincing system of perspective. From Raphael to Ruscha, from Watteau to Whistler, from Bingham to the Bauhaus, Deem meticulously reconstructed and reinterpreted the art of the past with insight, originality, and wit … In his analysis and interpretation of works such as these, Deem made his own, important contribution to the history of art."

Deem died of lung cancer in Manhattan in 2008.

Teaching
1965-66, School of Visual Arts, New York. Taught painting part-time
1966-67, Leicester College of Art and Technology, now De Montfort University. Taught painting part-time, commuting two days a week from London
1968, University of Pennsylvania, Philadelphia. Spring semester, taught painting two days a week, commuting from New York

Residencies
 Artist-in-Residence, Evansville Museum of Arts and Science, Evansville, Indiana, June 1979
 Visiting Artist, Illinois State University, Normal, Illinois, October 1982
 Artist-in Residence, The Branson School, Ross, California, January 1995
 Resident Fellow, MacDowell Colony, December 1977, January 1978, July 1979
 Secretary, Executive Committee, MacDowell Colony Fellows 1982-84

Award
 Vincennes University Faculty Citation for Outstanding Alumni, Vincennes, Indiana, November 20, 1981

Metropolitan Museum of Art
 Worked collating Christmas cards and in the display department at the Metropolitan Museum, 1958–60

Selected publications
 Deem, George (1993). Art School. Chronicle Books. 
 Deem, George (2004). How to Paint a Vermeer: A Painter's History of Art. Thames & Hudson. 
 Dearinger, David (2012). George Deem: The Art of Art History. Boston: The Boston Athenaeum.

References

External links
George Deem via Nancy Hoffman Gallery
George Deem via Artnet

1932 births
2008 deaths
20th-century American painters
American male painters
21st-century American painters
21st-century American male artists
Deaths from lung cancer in New York (state)
People from Vincennes, Indiana
Artists from Indiana
People from the Flatiron District, Manhattan
20th-century American male artists